Club Deportivo Asociación Estadio La Unión, commonly known as Deportivo AELU or simply AELU, is a Peruvian football club, playing in the city of Lima, Peru.

History
The Asociación Estadio La Unión was founded 1982 by the nikkei community of Peru.  

The AELU, as popularly is known, was the 1987 Segunda División Peruana champion.

The club have played at the highest level of Peruvian football on four occasions, from 1988 Torneo Descentralizado until 1991 Torneo Descentralizado when was relegated.

In the 1993 Segunda División Peruana, the club was relegated to Copa Perú. 

The club returned in the 1997 Segunda División Peruana until 2005.

Honours

National
Peruvian Segunda División: 1
Winners (1): 1987
Runner-up (3): 1984, 1986, 2001

Regional
Liga Departamental de Lima:
Winners (1): 1996

Liga Provincial de Lima:
Winners (1): 1996

Liga Distrital de Pueblo Libre:
Winners (10): 2009, 2010, 2012, 2014, 2015, 2016, 2017, 2018, 2019, 2022
Runner-up (2): 2011, 2013

See also
List of football clubs in Peru
Peruvian football league system

Football clubs in Peru
Association football clubs established in 1982
1982 establishments in Peru